Pål Erik Ulvestad (born 8 September 1990) is a Norwegian footballer who plays as a midfielder for Eliteserien club Kristiansund.

Career
Pål Erik Ulvestad is the brother of the former Burnley player Fredrik and Aalesund player Dan Peter Ulvestad, and son of the former footballer Rune Ulvestad.
Ulvestad grew up together with his teammate in Molde, Magnus Wolff Eikrem, whose father Knut Hallvard Eikrem was a teammate of Rune Ulvestad at Molde FK in the 80's.

He signed for Molde ahead of the 2011 season, and has contract with the club until the end of 2014. In his first season, he played nine league-matches and started two of them when Molde won the league.

Due to knee and groin injuries at the end of the 2011 season, Ulvestad missed parts of the pre-season in 2012, and in March he was sent on loan to the Second Division side Kristiansund until 1 August. Manager Ole Gunnar Solskjær said that several second tier clubs wanted Ulvestad on loan, but due to his injuries it would be best to play at the third tier. Ulvestad remained in Kristiansund throughout the season, and won promotion with the club.

Career statistics

References

External links
 Profile at MoldeFK.no

1990 births
Living people
People from Molde
Norwegian footballers
Molde FK players
Kristiansund BK players
Hønefoss BK players
Eliteserien players
Norwegian First Division players
Association football midfielders
Sportspeople from Møre og Romsdal